Phoenixville station is a former train station in Phoenixville, Pennsylvania. Located at 4 Bridge Street in Phoenixville, it is currently used for offices. 

Phoenixville station was originally built by the Reading Railroad, and later served the SEPTA diesel service extending from the Norristown section of the Manayunk/Norristown Line to Pottsville. It was taken out of service in 1981, when SEPTA discontinued the diesel service.  The station was also the terminus of the Pickering Valley Railroad to Eagle.

References

Former SEPTA Regional Rail stations
Former Reading Company stations
Railway stations closed in 1981
Former railway stations in Chester County, Pennsylvania